The University of Medicine, Taunggyi located in Taunggyi, Shan State is one of the universities of medicine in Myanmar. Founded in 2015, the university offers an M.B.,B.S. degree program.

The university started its first enrollment in December 2015 and accepted 200 students from Shan State and Kayah State.

Campus

The main building is home to the departments for first year M.B., B.S. subjects (Burmese, English, Mathematics and Statistics, Chemistry, Physics, Botany, and Zoology). The main building is also home to the Department of Administration, Department of Finance & Accounting, Department of Student Affairs, Department of Foreign Relations, Department of Examination, Department of the Library, Department of Sports, Department of Computer Science and Department of Campus.

Undergraduate curriculum
The M.B., B.S. program lasts seven years.

First Year M.B.,B.S.
Burmese
English
Mathematics & statistics
Physics
Chemistry
Botany
Zoology

Hands-on practical exams are required in the latter four subjects.

Second Year M.B.,B.S.
Anatomy
Physiology
Biochemistry

Hands-on practical exams are required in all subjects.

Third Year M.B.,B.S.
General Pathology
Microbiology
Pharmacology

Final year (Part 1)
Forensic Medicine
Preventive and Social Medicine (includes three weeks of residential field training in rural areas)
Systemic Pathology and haematology

Final year (Part 2)
Child Health
Medicine
Obstetrics & Gynaecology
Surgery

House surgeon training
After passing the Final Year Part II examination, students train for another year as house surgeons (residents) in one of the recognized teaching hospitals.

Department heads
Department of Myanmar language - Nang Taung
Department of English - Nang Kham Set
Department of Mathematics - Mya Mya Min
Department of Chemistry - Ohn Kyi
Department of Physics - Mee Mee Cho
Department of Botany - Su Su Chit
Department of Zoology - Hla Hla Yee
Department of Anatomy - Khin Thanda
Department of Physiology - Phyu Phyu Khin
Department of Biochemistry - Moe Moe Khine
Department of Pathology - Cho Cho Myint
Department of Microbiology - Tin Tin Myint
Department of Pharmacology - Latt Latt Win
Department of Preventive and Social Medicine Society - Cho Mar Kaung Myint
Department of Forensic Medicine - Thaung Linn
Department of Surgery - Tin Kyuu
Department of Medicine - Si Si Htun

Teaching hospitals
Sao San Tun General Hospital, Taunggyi
Women's and Children's Hospital, Taunggyi

See also
 List of universities in Myanmar
 Medical Universities (Myanmar)

References

Universities and colleges in Shan State
Medical schools in Myanmar
Educational institutions established in 2015
Buildings and structures in Shan State
2015 establishments in Myanmar